The 1981 Cal Poly Mustangs football team represented California Polytechnic State University, San Luis Obispo as a member of the California Collegiate Athletic Association (CCAA) during the 1981 NCAA Division II football season. Led by Joe Harper in his 14th and final season as head coach, Cal Poly compiled an overall record of 4–5 with a mark of 0–2 in conference play, placing last out of three teams in the CCAA. The Mustangs played home games at Mustang Stadium in San Luis Obispo, California.

1981 was the last season for CCAA football. The Mustangs won 12 football championships in their 36 years of membership, from 1946 to 1981,. All three 1981 football members of the CCAA (Cal State Northridge, Cal Poly Pomona, and Cal Poly) moved their football programs to the newly-formed Western Football Conference (WFC) for the 1982 season.

Schedule

Team players in the NFL
The following Cal Poly Mustang players were selected in the 1982 NFL Draft.

References

Cal Poly
Cal Poly Mustangs football seasons
Cal Poly Mustangs football